Samantha Miss was an Australian Thoroughbred racemare that won three Group One races for earnings of A$1,750,760 and was later sold as broodmare for a record $3.85 million.

She is a bay mare by the leading sire Redoute's Choice out of Milliyet (NZ) (Zabeel-Foreign Copy).  Samantha Miss was bred in New South Wales by  G.D. Witters.  She was purchased for $1.5 million at the 2007 yearling sales and earned $1,763,260 in 12 starts.

Racing career
Samantha Miss had five starts as a two-year-old for two wins, including the Champagne Stakes.  As a three-year-old, she had seven starts for five wins.  In Sydney, she became the first filly since Angst, in 1993, to win all four legs of the Princess Series - the Silver Shadow Stakes, the Furious Stakes, the Tea Rose Stakes, and the Flight Stakes.  In Melbourne, she took on the older horses when third in the Cox Plate and won the VRC Oaks by three lengths when she came back to her own age.  In the new year, she finished a close second in the Light Fingers Stakes on a heavy track.  A week later, Samantha Miss tore a tendon in training and, after weeks of consideration, was sent to the Australian Easter Broodmare Sale on 16 April 2009, where she was purchased by John Singleton.  It was announced that she would be retired to stud and served by More Than Ready.

Career results

Stud record
On 12 August 2010 Samantha Miss foaled a bay filly by More Than Ready (USA).

References

Racehorses bred in Australia
Racehorses trained in Australia
2005 racehorse births
Thoroughbred family 2-j